Charles Henderson Craven (November 30, 1843 in Portland, Maine – March 1, 1898 in Washington, D.C.) was an officer of the United States Navy.

Biography
He was a son of Thomas Tingey Craven. He graduated at the United States Naval Academy in 1863, during the American Civil War. He was promoted to ensign, and served in that capacity in the South Atlantic Blockading Squadron until 1863. He participated in many of the engagements in the vicinity of Charleston and Savannah during 1863/64, and was attached to the USS Housatonic when she was blown up in February 1864. From 1865 to 1867, he served in the European Squadron on the USS Colorado, and was commissioned lieutenant commander in November 1866. He then served on the USS Wampanoag, and was made lieutenant commander in March 1868, after which he was attached to the Pacific Squadron.

Subsequently he served on shore duty at Mare Island, California. In 1874 he became executive officer of the USS Kearsarge, of the Pacific Squadron, and later of the USS Monocacy.

He was detached from duty in June 1879, broken down by overwork, and was retired in May 1881.

Notes

References
 
Attribution

External links
 

1843 births
1898 deaths
United States Navy officers
Union Navy officers
United States Naval Academy alumni
Military personnel from Portland, Maine
People of Maine in the American Civil War